Newtownbutler or Newtown Butler is a small village in County Fermanagh, Northern Ireland. It is in the southeast corner of the county, near Lough Erne, the border with County Monaghan, Republic of Ireland, and the town of Clones. It is surrounded by small lakes and bogland. In the 2011 Census it had a population of 989 people.

History 
Newtownbutler began to be built as a Plantation village in the early 18th century. It was built within the townland of Aghagay.

The Battle of Newtownbutler took place nearby in 1689 during the Williamite War in Ireland.

The Troubles 

There were 13 deaths in and around Newtownbutler during the Troubles.

Amenities 

Crom Castle and Estate lie on the shores of Upper Lough Erne, just 3 miles from Newtownbutler. The estate was established in the early 17th century during the Plantation of Ulster. Crom Estate is owned by the Crichton family, Earls of Erne and is leased to the National Trust for public use. Crom Estate is also one of the most important sites in Northern Ireland for bats, with all eight Northern Ireland species recorded on the estate.

The present day Crom Castle was built in 1820 and, although Queen Victoria's reign began in 1837, the building was built in the Victorian style. The castle was designed by the English architect Edward Blore, who was also responsible for sections of Buckingham Palace. 

The village currently has two pubs, An Chead Chumann and Mulligans Bar and Lounge which regularly host an array of events and attract crowds in from across the county. The Lanesborough Arms Hotel (formerly Reilly's Bar) was another well known public house in Newwtownbutler that closed in 2004. The traditional bar was removed and transferred to the Ulster American Folk Park in Omagh. The village also has two supermarkets, two takeaways, a butchers, a chemists, a credit union, a church and parish hall, an orange hall, a community centre, GAA grounds and a large community playpark.

Notable people 

 William Thompson (1733–1799) the first President of the Methodist Conference after Wesley's death was born in Newtownbutler.
 Charles Irwin (1824-8 April 1873) was born in Manorhamilton, County Leitrim, and was an Irish recipient of the Victoria Cross. During the Siege of Lucknow on 16 November 1857 at Lucknow, India, Private Irwin showed conspicuous bravery at the assault on the Secundra Bagh when, although severely wounded through the right shoulder, he was one of the first to enter the building under heavy fire. He died on 29 March 1873 at Newtownbutler and is buried in Saint Mark's Churchyard, Magheraveely, County Fermanagh.
 Constantine Scollen (4 April 1841 - 8 November 1902) was born just outside the village, on Galloon Island in Lough Erne. He became a famous missionary among the native peoples of North America and actually lived with the people of the Blackfoot Confederacy in Canada for almost a decade. In total he spent over thirty years on the prairies. He died in Dayton, Ohio, in 1902.

Transport 
Newtownbutler railway station opened on 26 June 1858 and finally closed on 1 October 1957.

Demographics 
Newtownbutler is classified as a small village or hamlet by the Northern Ireland Statistics and Research Agency (NISRA) (i.e. with population between 500 and 1,000 people). On Census day (27 March 2011) there were 989 people living in Newtownbutler. Of these:
20.9% were aged under 16 years and 13.8% were aged 60 and over
49% of the population were male and 51% were female
81.5% were from a Catholic background; 17% were from a Protestant background and 1.5% were from an Other background
19% indicated that they had a British national identity, 53.5% had an Irish national identity and 27.8% had a Northern Irish national identity.

Sport
Newtownbutler is home to the Newtownbutler First Fermanaghs Gaelic football team. They play at all levels of football in both the men's and women's categories. Their last Fermanagh Senior Championship title came in 2007.

Groups

Marching bands 
According to the Ulster Bands Forum there are six marching bands operating in Newtownbutler Ward. Four are from Newtownbutler while the other two operate in the nearby village of Magheraveely. The four from Newtownbutler are: Feaugh Pipe Band; Loughkillygreen Accordion Band; Newtownbutler Flute Band; and Wattlebridge Accordion Band.

Orange Lodges 
According to The Grand Orange Lodge of Ireland, Newtownbutler District No.1 is the largest district in County Fermanagh with ten men's lodges and one women's lodge  The District covers the wards of Newtownbutler and Roslea. Five lodges operate within Newtownbutler and its immediate surrounding area. These are: LOL 184 Newtownbutler; LOL 391 Wattlebridge; LOL 854 Loughkillygreen; LOL 1219 Crom Castle; and LOL 1320 Feaugh.

There are also three Royal Black Preceptory lodges operating in the Newtownbutler area. They are: RBP 154 Newtownbutler; RBP 204 Loughkillygreen; RBP 811 Drummully

See also 
 Market Houses in Northern Ireland
 Wattlebridge

References

External links 
 Culture Northern Ireland

Villages in County Fermanagh